Sarel Francois Burger (born 13 February 1983) is a Namibian former cricketer. He is a right-handed batsman and a right-arm medium-fast bowler.

He played in two One Day Internationals in the Cricket World Cup in 2003. He also participated in List A cricket between 2001 and 2004 and participated in the ICC Trophy in July 2005. His brother Louis Burger played for Namibia in the World Cup, while Bernie Burger has played in the ICC Trophy.

In January 2018, he was named as captain of Namibia's squad for the 2018 ICC World Cricket League Division Two tournament.

In February 2018, he retired from cricket, after playing for Namibia against Free State in the 2017–18 CSA Provincial One-Day Challenge.

References

External links

1983 births
Living people
Namibian cricketers
Namibia One Day International cricketers
Cricketers from Windhoek
Namibian cricket captains